La Capelle is a commune in the Aisne department in Hauts-de-France in northern France. Its inhabitants are called Capellois (plural Capelloises).

Geography 
La Capelle had a station on the Busigny-Hirson railway line, which operated from 1885 to 1959 (and 1977 for freight traffic between Le Nouvion and La Capelle).

Toponymy 
The name of La Capelle comes from the Picard term designating a chapel. This chapel is dedicated to Saint Grimony.

History 
The village was founded by Saint Grimony, a saint of Irish origin of the 4th century. The village was of strategic importance, defending the French border against Avesnes-sur-Helpe, which was Spanish. It is 16 km from the Belgian border.

On November 7, 1918, at the end of World War I, it was at La Capelle that the German plenipotentiaries (headed by Matthias Erzberger), who had come to negotiate the armistice, crossed the front lines and met the commander Bourbon Busset. They were taken by car to Homblières, then to Tergnier where a special train was waiting to bring them to the clearing of Rethondes in the forest of Compiègne where on the morning of the 8th Marshal Foch, with the allied delegation, was awaiting them in his command train.

During World War II in 1940, during the Phoney War, General Paul Barbe installed at La Capelle the command post of his division, the 4th Light Cavalry Division.

Heraldry 
The top half of the coat of arms is azure with a silver crenelated wall, flanked by two towers of the same, with two gold lions facing away from each other, holding silver swords. The bottom half is in gules, with four gold bezants (coins).

Politics and Administration

Places and monuments 
Sainte-Grimonie Church of La Capelle

A Military bollard on the roadside of Avesnes-sur-Helpe is a Roman road marker. It is made of limestone and is cylindrical in shape.

Renowned racecourse: the racecourse of La Capelle, created in 1874.

The Villa Pasques 10, which was the place where the German plenipotentiary made contact with the allies to negotiate the armistice of 1918. Since 1992, the Villa Pasques has been the seat of the Community of Communes of the Thiérache Center.

Flower City 

Two flowers awarded in 2009 by the Council of Towns and Villages Fleuris of France in the Contest of the towns and villages in bloom.

Population

See also
 Communes of the Aisne department

References

Thiérache
Communes of Aisne
Aisne communes articles needing translation from French Wikipedia